Anthony Herrera (born June 14, 1980) is a former American football offensive guard.  He played college football for the University of Tennessee and was signed as an undrafted free agent by the Vikings.

Herrera was born a citizen of Trinidad and Tobago, but has now gained American citizenship.

Professional career

Herrera was the starting right guard for the Minnesota Vikings.

Media Appearance
Herrera is a contestant on NBC's Minute to Win It in an online exclusive episode playing to win money for the Indian Nations Football Conference and the Boys and Girls Club of Collier County.

Personal

Herrera attended Barron G. Collier High School in Naples, FL.

References

1980 births
Living people
American football offensive guards
Trinidad and Tobago players of American football
Tennessee Volunteers football players
African-American players of American football
Minnesota Vikings players
Trinidad and Tobago emigrants to the United States
21st-century African-American sportspeople
20th-century African-American people
Ed Block Courage Award recipients